The Engine Arm Aqueduct near Smethwick, West Midlands, England, was built in 1825 by Thomas Telford to carry a water feeder, the Engine Arm, from Edgbaston Reservoir over the BCN New Main Line canal to the adjacent and parallel Old Main Line. It is a Scheduled Ancient Monument and is Grade II* listed.

It is a  span structure consisting of a cast-iron trough supported by a single arch with five ribs, each consisting of four sections with bolted joints. The trough is supported on three of the ribs, with the adjacent towpaths being supported by cast-iron arcades of Gothic-styled arches and columns. All cast-iron features were manufactured at the Horseley Ironworks in nearby Tipton. The eastern towpath is paved in brick with raised strips for horses.

See also

Canals of the United Kingdom
History of the British canal system

References

Canal Companion - Birmingham Canal Navigations, J. M. Pearson & Associates, 1989, 

Canals in England
Canals in the West Midlands (county)
Transport in Sandwell
Birmingham Canal Navigations
Scheduled monuments in the West Midlands (county)
Navigable aqueducts in England
Smethwick
Cast-iron arch bridges in England
Grade II* listed buildings in the West Midlands (county)
Grade II* listed bridges in England
Cast iron aqueducts
1825 establishments in England
Bridges completed in 1825